The 1996 Supercopa de España was a two-leg Spanish football match played on 25 August and 28 August 1996. It was contested by Barcelona, who were Spanish Cup runners-up in 1995–96, and Atlético Madrid, who won the 1995–96 Spanish League and the 1995–96 Spanish Cup. Barcelona won 6–5 on aggregate.

Match details

First leg

Second leg

References
List of Super Cup Finals 1996 RSSSF.com

Supercopa de Espana Final
Supercopa de España
Supercopa de Espana 1996
Supercopa de Espana 1996